The 2014–15 SPFL Development League was the 17th season of the highest youth Scottish football league and the first season under the new "Development League" format. It began in August 2014 and ended in May 2015, with Aberdeen winning the league championship.

Changes
The league was again expanded, this time from 16 teams to 17 teams. It retained all 16 of the sides from the previous season, with newly promoted Scottish Premiership club Dundee admitted to the league. Eligible players were those born in 1995 or later, but five players of any age were permitted in the matchday squad of 18.

League table

Matches
Teams played each other twice, once at home, once away.

Top scorers

References

External links
SPFL

Development
Development
SPFL Development League